Ship In Your Trip is the debut album of the band Sorrowful Angels. It was recorded between October and December 2008. All music is credited to Dion Christodoulatos and lyrics to Dion Christodoulatos and Kostas Katikos.

Track listing
  "Second Life"   – 4:29
  "Denial"  – 3:49
  "A Long Stay"  – 4:25
  "Ship in Your Trip"  – 2:40
  "Laws of Deceit"  – 4:06
  "Red Sunrise"  – 3:33
  "Final Win"  – 3:29
  "Suicidal Manners"  – 3:46
  "How to Lose a Star"  – 5:08
  "I'm Home"  – 7:06

References

2009 debut albums
Sorrowful Angels albums